The following is a list of results for the Greece national rugby league team since their first match in 2003, where they defeated New Caledonia 26–10. They have played 29 matches, winning 20 and losing nine. Their most recent result was an 82–6 win against Serbia.

All time record

Results

2000s

2010s

2020s

External links 

 Greece results at Rugby League Project

References 

Rugby league records and statistics
Rugby league in Greece